Charles George Broyden (3 February 1933 – 20 May 2011) was a mathematician who specialized in optimization problems and numerical linear algebra. While a physicist working at English Electric Company from 1961–1965, he adapted the Davidon–Fletcher–Powell formula to solving some nonlinear systems of equations that he was working with, leading to his widely cited 1965 paper, "A class of methods for solving nonlinear simultaneous equations". He was a lecturer at UCW Aberystwyth from 1965–1967. He later became a senior lecturer at University of Essex from 1967–1970, where he independently discovered the Broyden–Fletcher–Goldfarb–Shanno (BFGS) method. The BFGS method has then become a key technique in solving nonlinear optimization problems. Moreover, he was among those who derived the symmetric rank-one updating formula, and his name was also attributed to Broyden's methods and Broyden family of quasi-Newton methods. After leaving the University of Essex, he continued his research career in the Netherlands and Italy, being awarded the chair at University of Bologna. In later years, he began focusing on numerical linear algebra, in particular conjugate gradient methods and their taxonomy.

Broyden died from complications of a severe stroke at the age of 78. He was survived by his wife, Joan, and their three children Chris, Jane and Nick.

A Charles Broyden Prize was established in 2009 to "honor this remarkable researcher" by Optimization Methods and Software in the international optimization community.

See also 
 Broyden's method
 BFGS method
 ABS methods

References 

20th-century British mathematicians
21st-century British mathematicians
People educated at Newport Free Grammar School
1933 births
2011 deaths